Mike K. McKell is an American lawyer and politician from the state of Utah.  A member of the Republican Party, McKell is a member of the Utah State Senate serving the 25th district. Prior to redistricting he represented the 7th District. He also previously served in the Utah House of Representatives, in the 66th district from 2013 to 2021. Spencer Cox, the Governor of Utah, is McKell's brother-in-law.

Early life and career
Martindale-Hubbell has confirmed that attorney Mike McKell maintains the AV Preeminent Rating, Martindale-Hubbell's highest possible rating for both ethical standards and legal ability.  On November 4, 2013, McKell was admitted in open court to the Supreme Court of the United States Bar. Mike McKell has been named by Utah Business Magazine multiple times as a member of Utah's Legal Elite.  In 2014, McKell was selected for his personal injury work. McKell has also been recognized in Super Lawers as a rising star in the Utah legal market.

Political career
 2012 Mckell was chosen out of four candidates at the Republican Primary on June 26, 2012. Mckell then defeated Democratic nominee Brian Hauglid in the general election on November 6, 2012 with 10,779 votes (85.8%). 
 2014 Mckell defeated Scott Woolston in the Republican convention and went on to win the General election held on November 4, 2014 against Zachary Lewis with 5,155 votes (84.4%).
During the 2016 legislative session, Representative McKell served on the Natural Resources, Agriculture, and Environmental Quality Appropriations Subcommittee, the House Revenue and Taxation Committee, the House Natural Resources, Agriculture, and Environment Committee, and the House Special Investigative Committee. During the interim, McKell served on the Public Utilities, Energy, and Technology Interim Committee and the Natural Resources, Agriculture, and Environment Interim Committee. He also served on the Legislative Process Committee.

 2020 ran successfully in his move to the Senate to replace Deidre Henderson, who ran successfully for the position of Lt. Governor.

2016 sponsored legislation
McKell also floor sponsored SB0031S01 Tax Commission Levy Process, SB0052S02 Rate Committee Modifications, SB0072 School and Institutional Trust Lands Management Amendments, SB0092 Water Conservation Amendments, SB0110S03 Water Quality Amendments, and SB0138 Health Insurance Coverage for Emergency Care, SB0173S02 State Fair Park Revisions, SB0182S02 Sales and Use Tax Revisions, SB0231 Waste Management Amendments, and SB0246S02 Funding for Infrastructure Revisions.

References

External links

 

Living people
Republican Party members of the Utah House of Representatives
21st-century American politicians
Year of birth missing (living people)